Pulosari may refer to:

 Pulosari, West Java, a village in Sukabumi regency, West Java
 Pulosari (volcano), at the western end of Java